Sophie Leigh Stone (born c. 1981)   is an English stage and television actress. She was the first deaf student to win a place at the drama school RADA. she is best known for her roles as Louise in Two Doors Down  and Doctor Who as Cass.

Life and career
Sophie Stone was born to guitarist Martin Stone, grew up in East London, and has been deaf since birth. She attended Mary Hare Grammar School for the Deaf. She took up a place at RADA after the birth of her son Phoenix (to whom she is a single mother), with the extra cost of her studies being supported by the Snowdon Trust.

Since graduating, she has played the role of Kattrin in Mother Courage and Her Children at the National Theatre and worked with other theatre companies.

In Spring 2014, she played Agnetha in Bryony Lavery's play Frozen, opening at the Birmingham Repertory Theatre.

In Autumn 2014, she took the leading role in the touring production of Woman of Flowers, a reworking of the Welsh myth of Blodeuwedd by playwright Kaite O'Reilly.

She has also appeared in episodes of several British television series and short films.

In 2015, she played the role of deaf crew-leader Cass in the Doctor Who episodes "Under the Lake" and "Before the Flood", who communicated entirely in British Sign Language. She was cast as Princess Alice of Battenberg, Prince Philip's mother, who was deaf herself, in Netflix's series 2 of 'the Crown'. In 2021 she played the lead in an episode of the BBC 1 anthology series Jimmy McGovern's Moving On.

In 2009, she played in "Coming Home", directed by the deaf director Louis Neethling. She played the deaf poet and activist Dorothy Miles in the docu-drama "Dot" in 2019.

She appeared in the short "Sign Night" with actress Vilma Jackson, which was broadcast on the BBC.

In 2020, she added radio to her credits, by being cast in a BBC Radio 3 drama "Beethoven Can Hear You" as a deaf traveller from the future that visits Beethoven (played by Peter Capaldi). She also wrote and spoke an essay about her relationship with music. This was part of the celebration for the 250th anniversary of Beethoven's birth.

In 2013, she co-founded the DH Ensemble Theatre Company, which creates plays that include deaf and hearing actors. She is also an Associate Artist for The Watermill Theatre, and in 2021 she guest-edited an anthology of Deaf authors for Arachne Press.

Credits

Film

Television
Chelsea Detective 
  Ashley Wilton

Theatre

References

External links

Deaf actresses
English television actresses
Living people
Alumni of RADA
Year of birth uncertain
1980s births
English deaf people
BSL users
21st-century English actresses
English stage actresses
English film actresses
Actresses from London
English radio actresses